Teleport may refer to:

 To teleport is to engage in the act of teleportation:
 Teleportation
 Quantum teleportation
 Warping, the act of interlevel teleporting in video games
Teleport (Amsterdam), a neighborhood of Amsterdam, Netherlands
Teleport Communications Group, a unit of AT&T
Teleport (Staten Island), a business park on Staten Island, New York
A telecommunications port, commonly shortened to "teleport", a type of satellite ground station
Telescopic handler, called "Teleport" in the UK and Ireland
Tokyo Teleport Station
Teleport (open-source software), a remote login tool

See also
Teleportation (disambiguation)